NSWR may refer to:

 New South Wales Government Railways
 Nuclear salt-water rocket

See also